The biodiversity of Colombia is the variety of indigenous organisms in the country with the second-highest biodiversity in the world, behind Brazil. As of 2021, around 63,000 species are registered in Colombia, of which 14% are endemic. The country occupies worldwide the first position in number of orchids, birds and butterflies, second position in plants, amphibians and fresh water fish, third place in species of palm trees and reptiles and globally holds the sixth position in biodiversity of mammals.

The country hosts 59 nationally designated protected areas. At the establishment of the most recent addition, Bahía Portete – Kaurrele National Natural Park, Colombian president Juan Manuel Santos said "Biodiversity is to Colombia, what oil is for the Arabs".

In 2020, according to the Colombian Biodiversity Information System, 63,303 species were registered in the country, of which more than 8,800 are considered endemic species. The country occupies the first position in the world in number of orchid and bird species, second in plants, amphibians, butterflies and freshwater fish, third in palm and reptile species, and fourth in mammalian biodiversity.

According to a report by the WWF, half of Colombia's ecosystems are in a critical state of deterioration or in a state of danger. The organization said that environmental degradation is due to oil extraction, mineral and metal extraction and deforestation. Deteriorating ecosystems are threatening the existence of more than a third of Colombia's plants and 50 percent of its animals.

Since 1998, the Humboldt Institute for Biological Resources has been collecting biodiversity samples. As of 2014, 16,469 samples, representing around 2,530 species of 1,289 genera, and 323 families from Colombian biodiversity have been stored in its archives.

Description 

Colombia is one of seventeen megadiverse countries in the world. The country in northwestern South America contains 311 types of coastal and continental ecosystems. As of the beginning of 2021, a total of between 63,000 and 71,000 species are registered in the country, with 8803 endemic species, representing near the 14% of the total registered species. Colombia is the country with the most páramos in the world; more than 60% of the Andean ecosystem is found within Colombian territories. Boyacá is the department where 18.3% of the national total area is located. Since December 20, 2014, Colombia hosts 59 protected areas. The biodiversity is highest in the Andean natural region, followed by the Amazon natural region. Since 1998, the Humboldt Institute for Biological Resources in the country has been collecting samples of biodiversity. As of 2014, 16,469 samples, representing around 2530 species from 1289 genera, and 323 families of the Colombian biodiversity have been stored in their archives.

The biodiversity of Colombia is at risk, mainly because of habitat loss, urbanisation, deforestation and overfishing. According to a study of 2001,  of forested area is lost every year. Around 1300 species are critically endangered, and 509 species are introduced in Colombia, 22 of which are classified as invasive species in Colombia. Various plans to address the environmental issues are proposed. The National System of Protected Areas (SINAP) is the administrator of protected areas.

Biodiversity in numbers 

To commemorate the biodiversity of Colombia, the coins of the Colombian peso introduced in 2012 feature a species each.

Natural regions 

Colombia is divided into six natural regions.

Caribbean natural region

Andean natural region

Orinoquía natural region

Amazon natural region

Pacific/Chocó natural region

Insular natural region

Biodiversity hotspots 

Colombia hosts two biodiversity hotspots; the Tropical Andes and Tumbes–Chocó–Magdalena. The country is part of the World Network of Biosphere Reserves with five biosphere reserves:

Species

Selected fauna

Selected endemic flora

Selected endemic fungi

Panoramas

See also 
 Biodiversity of the Eastern Hills, Bogotá
 Conservation biology
 Biodiversity of Thomas van der Hammen Natural Reserve
 Biodiversity of Cape Town, New Caledonia, New Zealand
 Biodiversity of Borneo, environmental issues in Colombia
 Environmental personhood

References

Bibliography

External links 
 Biodiversidad Colombia - Universidad de La Salle 
Colombia: Bajo Caguán-Caquetá Rapid Inventory    [PDF]
Colombia: La Lindosa, Capricho, Cerritos Rapid Inventory   [PDF]

Environment of Colombia

.
.
.
.
Colombia